Italy competed at the 1973 European Athletics Indoor Championships in Rotterdam, Netherlands, from 10 to 11 March 1973.

Medalists

Top eight
Three Italian athletes reached the top eight in this edition of the championships.
Men

Women
In this edition of the championships, no Italian woman reached the top eight.

See also
 Italy national athletics team

References

External links
 EAA official site 

1973
1973 European Athletics Indoor Championships
1973 in Italian sport